Joseph "Robbie" Robertson is a fictional character appearing in American comic books published by Marvel Comics, usually in association with Spider-Man. Created by Stan Lee and John Romita Sr., he first appeared in The Amazing Spider-Man #51 (August 1967), and has since endured as a supporting character of the wall-crawler.

Robbie Robertson was one of the first black characters in comics to play a serious supporting role, rather than act as comic relief. He has usually been a high-ranking editor at the New York newspaper, the Daily Bugle, and a close friend and confidant of publisher J. Jonah Jameson, acting as a voice of reason in Jameson's campaign to discredit Spider-Man. He is more friendly and supportive of Peter Parker as well as the other Daily Bugle staffers than the brash Jameson. In the 1980s, the character's backstory was explored, revealing a past conflict with the supervillain Tombstone, with whom he attended high school; these stories were well received by readers and contributed to greater interest in his character.

The character has appeared in several media adaptations outside of comics over the years, including films, animated series, and video games. Actor Bill Nunn played Robbie Robertson in Sam Raimi's Spider-Man trilogy.

Publication history
Gerry Conway's run on The Spectacular Spider-Man and Web of Spider-Man expanded Robertson's back story with a dark history involving the hit man Tombstone which continues to haunt Robertson in the present. The stories drew an exceptionally intense level of reader interest. Editor Jim Salicrup recalled that "some of the most jaded, seen-it-all before guys - namely the guys in Marvel's production department - got hooked on the Tombstone/Joe Robertson soap opera. They'd actually come into my office concerned about what was going to happen to Robbie next. 'He's not going to jail, is he?' they'd ask".

Fictional character biography
Joseph Robertson was born in Harlem. He is married to Martha and they have had two sons. Their first son, Patrick Henry Robertson, died when he was only six months old. Their second son, Randy, is divorced. Growing up in a working-class family and being a member of a racial minority, Robertson seemed to sympathize with the downtrodden, including Marvel Comics' mutants, and he preached tolerance. He was forced to practice what he preached when his son came home from college with his white Jewish wife, Amanda.

Robertson is the editor-in-chief of the Daily Bugle, the newspaper at which Peter Parker works and sells his photographs of Spider-Man. Unlike the Bugles volatile publisher, J. Jonah Jameson, Robbie tries his best to remain objective towards Spider-Man. Robbie is also the only Bugle employee who does not fear the wrath of his boss and is ready to stand up to him on editorial matters. Robbie serves as publisher when Jameson temporarily steps down. Robbie was a close personal friend of Captain George Stacy, and it has been implied, although not outright stated, that Robbie has deduced Spider-Man's secret identity, as Stacy did. Robbie's son Randy is also a close friend of Peter Parker, and the two briefly share an apartment when Mary Jane is presumed dead and Peter had been evicted.

Robbie grew up in Harlem, and as a teenager was a classmate of Lonnie Thompson Lincoln, later infamous as the brutal hit man Tombstone. Robbie once wrote an article for the high school newspaper about Lincoln's bullying and extortion, but spiked it after being threatened by Lincoln. Years later, while working as a reporter in Philadelphia, Robbie witnessed Lincoln murder one of Robbie's contacts. Once again, Lincoln threatened Robertson, and the journalist fled to New York City and began working for the Bugle. He told no one of the murder he witnessed.

Twenty years later, when Tombstone takes a job with the Kingpin, Robbie, determined not to be intimidated again, begins collecting evidence of past crimes that would have Tombstone incarcerated for life. Tombstone hunts Robbie down and breaks his back with his bare hands. Robbie is laid up for months as a result of this, but makes a full recovery, as his spine was not broken.

Tombstone is arrested and tried, thanks in part to Spider-Man. Breaking 20 years of silence, Robbie testifies against his old schoolmate in court. The judge, however, is on the Kingpin's payroll and circumstances lead to Robertson having to agree to serve 3 years himself for withholding evidence of the Philadelphia murder. Robbie and Tombstone end up in the same cell block, where the hit man makes Robbie's life miserable. So broken is Robbie's spirit that he halfheartedly goes along with a jailbreak. However, when Tombstone attacks an interfering Spider-Man, Robbie regains his nerve and saves him. Robbie and Tombstone fall out of the escape helicopter and land in a river near an Amish farm.

Things came to a head when Robbie moved to defend the farmer's family from Tombstone, stabbing him with a pitchfork. Stunned by this, Tombstone backs off. While Tombstone has not abandoned his murderous ways, he has officially called off his vendetta on Robbie. Robbie receives a pardon and resumes work at the Daily Bugle.

After Peter's "coming out", Robbie reveals he knew Peter was Spider-Man and stands up to J. Jonah Jameson after all the years about his treatment to Peter/Spider-Man. Unable or unwilling to admit that he had gone too far in his hatred of Spider-Man, Jameson fires Robertson. However, he rehires him shortly after.

During the "Brand New Day" storyline, where all knowledge of Peter Parker's marriage to Mary Jane has been erased by Mephisto and Spider-Man's secret identity has somehow been removed from the minds of everyone in the world, Jameson suffers a heart attack brought on by arguing with Peter Parker, and the Bugle is bought by Dexter Bennett, who turns it into a scandalous, muck-raking rag. Robbie, though disapproving, decides to stay, hoping Bennet will get better. He soon realizes that is not going to happen, particularly after learning the DB was indirectly responsible for the death of several people shown on their paper from one of their scandals and resigns. Robertson becomes the editor for Ben Urich's newspaper, Front Line.

Sometime after the DB'''s destruction, Jameson, as the Mayor of New York City, cashed in the DB shares he acquired from Bennett and gave the money to Robbie Robertson. Jameson asked Robertson to remake Front Line (which itself was on hard times) into the new Daily Bugle.

After Phil Urich is exposed as the new Hobgoblin, to protect the Daily Bugle's reputation, Robbie benches Ben Urich until this situation blows over and fires Phil's ex-girlfriend Norah Winters. During the later Goblin coup of New York, Ben attempts to arrange a meeting to talk Phil down and convince him to accept a cure for the Goblin formula, but when Robbie is discovered in the area, Phil believes that Ben was trying to set a trap and delivers a serious injury to Robbie before Spider-Man appears.

Other versions

Age of Apocalypse
In the Age of Apocalypse reality, Robbie Robertson is editor of the Daily Bugle, which in this timeline is a clandestine paper dedicated to informing humans of the secrets of Apocalypse. He is killed by the Brood-infested Christopher Summers (the father of Scott, Alex and Gabriel Summers).

Marvel Noir
In Spider-Man Noir: Eyes without a Face, Robbie is investigating the disappearances of African-Americans from Harlem, which leads him to accompany Peter Parker to meet Otto Octavius on Ellis Island. Robbie is captured, and later lobotomised, as Doctor Octopus is operating on the aforementioned African-Americans to try to get the perfect slave. Peter eventually liberates the prisoners, but feels remorse for not getting to Robbie sooner. Later, Robbie's family, and Glory Grant, are outraged that Octavius did not stand trial, as he was doing government research.

MC2
In the MC2 universe, Robbie Robertson was killed by Doctor Octopus shortly after the disappearance/retirement of Spider-Man. This motivates Jameson to initiate "Project: Human Fly", an attempt to create a government controlled superhero. This adventure also features Richie Robertson, Robbie's grandson.

Spider-Verse
During the Spider-Verse storyline, the Earth-001 version of Robbie Robertson works as an importer/trader in service to the Inheritors. Robbie is served at his import company by Lance Bannon and Nicholas Katzenberg. He met Verna's servant Ms. Drew at the docks to delivery barrels full of wine for a grand feast that the Inheritors had prepared from their hunt on the Spider Totems.

Ultimate Marvel
In the Ultimate Marvel universe, Robbie does not have much of a relationship with Peter due to the Bugle not being as big a role in Peter's life. Robbie has been employed there a number of years before Peter showed up. He is frequently seen arguing with Jameson (usually aided by Ben Urich), though it rarely ends up in shouting, as it does in Earth-616.

What If
In What If Gwen Stacy had lived?, Robbie gives Gwen away to Peter at their wedding, but the wedding is ruined when Jameson appears; with the Goblin having mailed evidence of Spider-Man's true identity to Jameson, Jameson has published the story and now has a warrant for Peter's arrest. Disgusted at Jameson's disregard of all the times that Peter has saved his life as Spider-Man, Robbie angrily quits the Bugle and walks off with Gwen, assuring her that they will do all that they can to help Peter.

In other media
Television
 A younger version of Robbie Robertson appears in the 1977 film The Amazing Spider-Man, portrayed by Hilly Hicks.
 Robbie Robertson appears in the 1981 Spider-Man series, voiced by Lewis Bailey.

 Robbie Robertson appears in the 1994 Spider-Man series, voiced by Rodney Saulsberry. Similarly to the comics, he is J. Jonah Jameson's right-hand man who is always trying to convince him that Spider-Man is not evil as well as the former childhood friend of Lonnie Lincoln. In this continuity, Robbie and Lonnie accidentally threw a basketball through a grocery store window and the former abandoned the latter when the police arrived, leading to Lonnie's arrest. Years later, Robbie got a job at a local newspaper and investigates a chemical plant, where he re-encountered Lonnie, who had become a criminal. Lonnie attempted to have Robbie arrested like he was, but ended up falling into a chemical vat and presumed dead. Deciding to atone for his past, Robbie stayed behind to explain what happened to the police, who let him go. By the time he joined the Daily Bugle, he is horrified to discover his son Randy has joined a gang led by Lonnie, now operating as Tombstone. With Spider-Man's help, Robbie has Tombstone arrested and saves Randy.
 An alternate reality version of Robbie who shares Jameson's belief that Spider-Man is evil appears in the episode "I Really, Really Hate Clones".
 Robbie Robertson appears in The Spectacular Spider-Man, voiced by Phil LaMarr.
 Robbie Robertson appears in The Avengers: Earth's Mightiest Heroes episode "Along Came a Spider", voiced by Troy Baker.
 Robbie Robertson appears in the 2017 Spider-Man series, voiced by Ernie Hudson.

Film
 Robbie Robertson appears in Sam Raimi's Spider-Man film trilogy, portrayed by Bill Nunn.
 Robbie Robertson was included in the original script for The Amazing Spider-Man 2 (2014). However, he was cut from the final screenplay.

Video games
 Robbie Robertson appears in the Spider-Man 2 film tie-in game, voiced by Jeff Coopwood.
 Robbie Robertson appears in the Spider-Man 3 film tie-in game, voiced by Charlie Robinson.
 Robbie Robertson appears in Marvel Super Heroes vs. Street Fighters "TV Studio" stage if Spider-Man is fighting in it.
 Robbie Robertson appears in Spider-Man's ending for Marvel vs. Capcom 3: Fate of Two Worlds''.

References

External links
Robertson's Profile at Spiderfan.org
Robbie Robertson at Marvel.com

Fictional African-American people
Black characters in films
Comics characters introduced in 1967
Fictional newspaper editors
Fictional characters from Manhattan
Spider-Man characters
Marvel Comics film characters
Characters created by Stan Lee
Characters created by John Romita Sr.
Fictional reporters
Black people in comics